The Enciclopedia Dantesca, published 1970–1975 by the Istituto dell'Enciclopedia Italiana, in six volumes, under the general editorship of Umberto Bosco, is considered the reference book in Italian language about the life and works of Dante, described as a "monumental" work

References

External links
 Enciclopedia Dantesca - online edition

Dante Alighieri
Encyclopedias of literature
1970s books
Italian biographies
Italian-language encyclopedias
20th-century encyclopedias